Abdul Kader Khan (born 31 March 1952) is a Jatiya Party politician and a former Jatiya Sangsad member representing the Gaibandha-1 constituency. In June 2019, Khan was sentenced to life imprisonment for possessing a firearm and an additional 15 years for possessing ammunitions.

Career
Khan is a retired medical officer of Bangladesh Army with the rank of colonel. He was elected to parliament from Jatiya Party of the Grand Alliance in 2008 representing Gaibandha-1.

Charges
On 21 February 2017, Khan was arrested his house in Bogra, in connection with the murder of Manjurul Islam Liton, the then incumbent Jatiya Sangsad member from the same constituency. 4 days later, Khan confessed his involvement in the murder. He was sentenced to death on 28 November 2019.

References

Living people
1952 births
Jatiya Party politicians
Bangladesh Army colonels
9th Jatiya Sangsad members
Bangladeshi politicians convicted of crimes
Place of birth missing (living people)
Bangladeshi male criminals
Prisoners and detainees of Bangladesh